The Balkan Marathon Championships is an annual road running competition over the marathon distance (42.195 km) between athletes from member nations of Balkan Athletics. It is one of two road running championships for the region, alongside the Balkan Half Marathon Championships (established in 2012).

Following an unofficial gathering of Balkan athletes in 1929, the Balkan Marathon Championship was formally established within the Balkan Athletics Championships in 1930. It was a men's competition exclusively until 1990, when a women's race was also added. The marathon event was separated from the track and field competition in 1996 and was established as an annual competition in its own right. The competition has not been held every year since, though it has been consistently held as an annual fixture from 2009 onwards. The venue varies each year and the championship is usually contested within an independently organised marathon in a city in the Balkans. A national team aspect was included in the competition in 2019. 

Turkey is historically the most successful nation in the men's race, followed by Greece, while Serbia has produced the most female winners. Individually, Franjo Škrinjar of Yugoslavia has won the most titles with six and Serbia's Olivera Jevtić has the title of most successful woman with four wins.

List of winners

References

Winners list
Balkan Championships. GBR Athletics. Retrieved 2020-02-06.
Balkan Marathon Championships. Association of Road Racing Statisticians. Retrieved 2020-02-06.

External links
Official website of Balkan Athletics

Marathons in Europe
Marathon
Recurring sporting events established in 1930
Annual sporting events